Trousdale Estates is a neighborhood of Beverly Hills, California, located in the foothills of the Santa Monica mountains. It was developed in the 1950s and 1960s and is named after Paul Trousdale, a real estate developer.

, the average sale price of a home in Trousdale Estates was over $11 million.

History
The grounds originally belonged to Mrs. Lucy Smith Doheny Battson, wife of Edward L. Doheny, Jr. (1893–1929), son of oil tycoon Edward L. Doheny (1856–1935); were known as the Doheny Ranch or the Doheny Estate; and included the Greystone Mansion, which is now a United States Historical Site. In 1954, Paul Trousdale (1915–1990) purchased the grounds, while the mansion was purchased by industrialist Henry Crown (1896–1990). Shortly after, Trousdale convinced the Beverly Hills City Council to add the neighborhood to the city, which they accepted, and he renamed it the Trousdale Estates.

Trousdale first built 532 original lots, all subject to strict regulations devised by the Architectural Committee, including how high roofs could be. Early houses were designed by renowned architects Wallace Neff (1895–1982), Paul R. Williams (1894–1980), A. Quincy Jones (1913–1979), Frank Lloyd Wright (1867–1959) and Harold Levitt (1922–2003). Allen Siple (1900–1973) acted as the supervising architect.

By 1981, some houses were remodeled, blocking their neighbors' views. As a result, after some consultation in 1987 the Trousdale Estates Homeowners Association, a non-profit organization, and the City of Beverly Hills implemented the Trousdale Ordinance to preserve the neighborhood. There are also "view protections" that protect a resident's view from neighboring trees, outlined in the Trousdale Ordinance. The City of Beverly Hills now enforces these building codes and view protections.

The  neighborhood has 24/7 security patrol cars with armed guards. In addition, the Beverly Hills Police Department has increased its day and night rounds in the neighborhood with dedicated patrols.

Loma Vista is the main thoroughfare in Trousdale Estates.

Notable residents
Celebrity residents have included Elvis Presley, Frank Sinatra, Dean Martin, Tony Curtis, Ray Charles, Howard Hughes, and Groucho Marx.  President Richard Nixon lived in the neighborhood from 1962 to 1963. When Nixon, who had just been Vice President from 1953 to 1961 under President Dwight D. Eisenhower, purchased his residence, Frank McCullogh of the Los Angeles Times reported that he had paid only $90,000 for a house whose real price was $300,000, as the developers believed his name would add prestige to the neighborhood.

More recently, Jennifer Aniston, Elton John, David Spade, Zoë de Givenchy, Vera Wang, Billy Dee Williams, John Rich, Jane Fonda, Richard Perry, Markus Persson, Ringo Starr, Simon Cowell, and Charlie Puth have lived in the neighborhood.

Jeffery Katzenberg, who co-founded DreamWorks, bought a $35 million,  mansion in Trousdale Estates from Simon Ramo, an American physicist, engineer, and business leader. Katzenberg hosted fundraisers for President Barack Obama at this mansion.

In July 2019, Uber co-founder Garrett Camp and his wife Eliza Nguyen bought an  mansion for $72.5 million in Trousdale Estates.

In August 2021, Cindy Crawford and Rande Gerber sold their home in Trousdale Estates for a reported $13.5 million.

In February 2022, David Spade sold his home in Trousdale Estates for a reported $19.5 million.

In February 2022, producer and Otto GmbH heiress Katharina Otto-Bernstein bought a home for $13.8 million.

In popular culture
Trousdale Estates plays a role in Seasons Two and Three of the Showtime TV series Ray Donovan as the eponymous character attempts to buy a $4 million house in the neighborhood.  In the series, it is a symbol of "moving up" from nearby Calabasas, although it may be worth noting that Calabasas in itself is a wealthy city, in fact wealthier than Beverly Hills as a whole, if not Trousdale Estates in particular.

References

Further reading 
 

Beverly Hills, California